Komoé or Comoé may refer to:

 Komoé River
 Comoé Province, Burkina Faso
 Comoé District, Ivory Coast
 Comoé National Park, Ivory Coast